{{Speciesbox
|image =
|name=Ranji bush
|genus = Acacia
|species =pyrifolia
|authority = DC.
|synonyms = *Acacia clementii Domin 
Acacia morrisonii Domin  
Acacia pyrifolia var. morrisonii Maiden
Acacia pyrifolia var. morrisoni orth. var. MaidenRacosperma pyrifolium (DC.) Pedley
|range_map = Acacia pyrifoliaDistMap742.png
|range_map_caption = Occurrence data from AVH
}}Acacia pyrifolia, commonly known as ranji bush is a shrub that is endemic to the north of Western Australia.

Description
It can have an open an straggly a sometimes dense habit. The glabrous branchlets are often covered in a fine white powdery coating and have spinose stipules. Like most species of Acacia it has phyllodes rather than true leaves. It produces rounded yellow flowerheads between April and August in the species' native range. Following flowering shallowly curved to openly once-coiled seed pods form that have a narrowly oblong shape and are rounded over seeds.

Taxonomy
It was first formally described in 1825 by Swiss botanist Augustin Pyramus de Candolle in the second volume of his publication Prodromus Systematis Naturalis Regni Vegetabilis.
The species is closely related to Acacia inaequilatera, Acacia strongylophylla and Acacia marramamba and A. strongylophylla which make up the Acacia pyrifolia group which is closely allied to the Acacia victoriae'' group.

Distribution
The plant is found in the Pilbara, Kimberley and northern parts of the Mid West regions of Western Australia where it is situated along watercourses, on plains and lower slopes and along road-sides growing in sand or loamy clay or alluvial sand or skeletal soils often over or around sandstone. Its range extends from around Carnarvon in the west to around Meektharra in the south to Rudall River National Park in the east and Wallal Downs in the north. It is also found  near Windjana Gorge to around Halls Creek in the southern part of the Kimberley.

See also
List of Acacia species

References

pyrifolia
Acacias of Western Australia
Fabales of Australia
Taxa named by Augustin Pyramus de Candolle
Plants described in 1825